Mize may refer to:

People
Billy Mize (1929–2017), American musician, TV show host
Bob Mize (1907–2000), American Anglican bishop
Casey Mize (born 1997), American professional baseball player
Chester L. Mize (1917–1994), American politician
Johnny Mize (1913–1993), American Major League Baseball player
Larry Mize (born 1958), American golfer
Ola L. Mize (1931–2014), retired US Army colonel and Medal of Honor recipient
Verna Grahek Mize (1913–2013), American environmental activist

Places in the United States
Mize, Kentucky, an unincorporated community
Mize, Georgia, an unincorporated community
Mize, Mississippi, a town